Mount Kozyak is the ice-covered peak rising to 709 m in Brugmann Mountains on Liège Island in the Palmer Archipelago, Antarctica.  It surmounts Coria Cove to the northeast, Beripara Cove to the south and Sigmen Glacier to the northwest.

The feature is named after the settlement of Kozyak in Northeastern Bulgaria.

Location
British mapping in 1978.

Maps
 British Antarctic Territory.  Scale 1:200000 topographic map.  DOS 610 Series, Sheet W 64 60.  Directorate of Overseas Surveys, UK, 1978.
 Antarctic Digital Database (ADD). Scale 1:250000 topographic map of Antarctica. Scientific Committee on Antarctic Research (SCAR). Since 1993, regularly upgraded and updated.

Notes

References
 Bulgarian Antarctic Gazetteer. Antarctic Place-names Commission. (details in Bulgarian, basic data in English)
 Mount Kozyak. SCAR Composite Antarctic Gazetteer.

External links
 Mount Kozyak. Copernix satellite image

Mountains of the Palmer Archipelago
Bulgaria and the Antarctic
Liège Island